Scopula semignobilis is a moth of the family Geometridae. It was described by Hiroshi Inoue in 1942. It is found in Japan and the Russian Far East.

References

Moths described in 1942
semignobilis
Moths of Japan
Moths of Asia
Taxa named by Hiroshi Inoue